Anthony Boyle may refer to:

 Anthony Boyle (born 1994), Northern Irish actor 
 Lieutenant colonel Anthony Boyle (army), former astronaut candidate in the British space programme
 Major General Anthony Hugh Boyle, former member of Royal Corps of Signals and recipient of 1996 New Year Honours Companions of the Order of the Bath (C.B.)